All That's ninth season ran from October 11, 2003 to February 21, 2004 and is the third season of the relaunch cast.

Many changes happened before the start of this season. Bryan Hearne left the show after two seasons to focus on his music career, although the rest of the cast from the previous season returned for their third season on the show.

During the off-season Nickelodeon advertised a competition called "R U All That?: Nickelodeon's Search for the Funniest Kid in America". It was a nationwide search to find a new cast member. Two of the judges happened to be former cast members Amanda Bynes and Nick Cannon; Josh Peck (who was then known for The Amanda Show) was also a judge. After this contest ended in early 2003, the finals aired on July 26, 2003. The contest picked five finalists, and all of them performed a sketch with some of the cast members. The winner was Christina Kirkman, who joined the show in the season opener and replaced Bryan Hearne. Ryan Coleman, the runner up in the contest, joined mid season.

Ratings wise the show was not doing well. In order to raise ratings the producers brought back old fan favorite sketches, like Good Burger. They put in Coleman in a test skit for the role of Ed. They thought the fit would work, resulting in the revision of the skit.

This would be the final season for cast members Shane Lyons, Giovonnie Samuels, and Jamie Lynn Spears. Shane Lyons left All That after opting not to renew his contract. Giovonnie Samuels left because she felt was too old to be on All That, similar to original cast member Lori Beth Denberg exiting after Season 4. Jamie Lynn Spears left to star in her own Nickelodeon show Zoey 101, a show also created by Dan Schneider.

The cast of Season 9 continued to do On-Air Dares. Like the last season. The intro was changed for this season. This time the cast is in the same place. They are dancing in a dark room with the All That logo in the back. It is lighted up. The cast however is now wearing red, unlike that of white in Seasons 7 and 8. The "Oh" sign was brought back, Brummet and Kirkman both held the sign in the intro. It is similar to the previous two seasons. The intro was changed to accommodate Coleman's entry onto the show.

This is the first season since Season 3 to have more female cast members then male.

All That won Favorite TV Show at the 2004 Kids' Choice Awards for the first time in 4 years.

Cast
Repertory players
 Chelsea Brummet
 Ryan Coleman (first episode: January 10, 2004)
 Jack DeSena
 Lisa Foiles
 Christina Kirkman
 Shane Lyons 
 Giovonnie Samuels  
 Jamie Lynn Spears  
 Kyle Sullivan

Episodes

References

External links
Season 9 opening title

2003 American television seasons
2004 American television seasons
All That seasons